Bulgaria competed at the 2020 Winter Youth Olympics in Lausanne, Switzerland from 9 to 22 January 2020.

Medalists

Alpine skiing

Boys

Girls

Biathlon

Boys

Girls

Mixed

Cross-country skiing 

Boys

Figure skating

Singles

Ice hockey

Mixed NOC 3x3 tournament 

Boys
Nino Tomov

Girls
Maria Runevska

Luge

Boys

Short track speed skating

Boys

Snowboarding

Snowboard cross

Halfpipe, Slopestyle, & Big Air

See also
Bulgaria at the 2020 Summer Olympics

References

2020 in Bulgarian sport
Nations at the 2020 Winter Youth Olympics
Bulgaria at the Youth Olympics